Hieracium scouleri, known as Scouler's woollyweed, is a species of flowering plant in the tribe Cichorieae within the family Asteraceae. It is native to western North America, from British Columbia and Alberta in Canada, and south to northern California and Utah in the United States.

Description
Hieracium scouleri grows in a variety of mountainous habitats. Each flower head has large, curling bracts with glandular hairs or bristles, long, bright yellow ray florets but no disc florets.

References

External links

Jepson Manual Treatment
Calphotos Photo gallery, University of California
Oregon Flora Image Project, University of Hawai'i

scouleri
Flora of the Northwestern United States
Flora of Western Canada
Plants described in 1833
Taxa named by William Jackson Hooker
Flora without expected TNC conservation status